Live It Up! is an album by American pop singer Johnny Mathis that was released on December 11, 1961, by Columbia Records and was the second of two album collaborations with arranger and conductor Nelson Riddle. The singer again eschewed ballads as he had on Swing Softly and selected a balance of new and established material.

The album debuted on Billboard magazine's album chart in the issue dated February 24, 1962, to begin a stay of 39 weeks, during which time it got as high as number 14.

This album was released for the first time on compact disc in a two-disc set with his other Riddle project, 1961's I'll Buy You A Star, on June 9, 2009.

Reception
Billboard was enthusiastic. "This is easily one of Mathis's best albums", they wrote. "He's really in a swingin' mood, and he gets standout arrangements to match from Nelson Riddle."

Track listing

Side one
"Live It Up" (Alan Bergman, Marilyn Bergman) – 3:28
"Just Friends" (John Klenner, Sam M. Lewis) – 4:01
"Ace in the Hole" from Let's Face It! (Cole Porter) – 2:46
"On a Cold and Rainy Day" (Lee Pockriss, Paul Vance) – 3:06
"Why Not" (Otis G. Clements, Sydney Shaw) – 2:08
"I Won't Dance" from Roberta (Dorothy Fields, Oscar Hammerstein II, Otto Harbach, Jerome Kern, Jimmy McHugh) – 3:58

Side two
"Johnny One Note" from Babes in Arms (Lorenz Hart, Richard Rodgers) – 2:39
"Too Much Too Soon" (Marvin Fisher, Jack Segal) – 2:51
"The Riviera" (Cy Coleman, Joseph Allen McCarthy) – 3:03
"Crazy in the Heart" (William Engvick, Alec Wilder) – 3:55
"Hey, Look Me Over" from Wildcat (Coleman, Carolyn Leigh) – 1:48
"Love" from Ziegfeld Follies (Ralph Blane, Hugh Martin) – 3:46

Recording dates
From the liner notes for The Voice of Romance: The Columbia Original Album Collection:
April 24, 1961 — "Ace in the Hole", "Johnny One Note", "Just Friends", "Live It Up", "The Riviera"
April 25, 1961 — "Crazy in the Heart", "Hey, Look Me Over", "I Won't Dance", "Love", "On a Cold and Rainy Day", "Too Much Too Soon", "Why Not"

Personnel
Johnny Mathis – vocals
Irving Townsend – producer
Nelson Riddle – arranger and conductor
Bob Cato – cover photo
Curtis F. Brown – liner notes

References

Bibliography

1962 albums
Johnny Mathis albums
Columbia Records albums
Albums produced by Irving Townsend
Albums conducted by Nelson Riddle
Albums arranged by Nelson Riddle